Andrija Torkvat Brlić (15 May 1826 – 21 May 1868) was a writer, linguist, politician and lawyer from Croatia at the time it was in the Austrian Empire. A follower of the Illyrian movement, Brlić was one of the most prominent advocates of unification of South Slavs in the 19th century.

Biography 

Andrija Torkvat Brlić was born on 15 May 1826 in Brod na Savi, then part of the Austrian Empire. He was a descendant of the Ragusan Brlić family. There is a tradition of considering them a Herzegovina family, with a mention of a Zahumlje prince named Brlić in 1393, and it's reasonable to assume this family would be their descendents, but the historical sources for them start in the early 18th century in the village of Svinjar (today's Davor). His mother Katarina hailed from Vukovar while his father Ignjat Alojzij Brlić, was a merchant, linguist, publicist and translator. Ignjat Alojzije Brlić was a noted participant of the Illyrian movement himself, his 'Illyrian' grammar first published in 1833 being one of the first Croatian grammar books, even as he disagreed with the likes of Ljudevit Gaj, arguing that his ikavian dialect should be a literary language.

Andrija Torkvat Brlić attended elementary school (lower gymnasium) in Vinkovci, and his father sent him to a Zagreb seminary in 1841. He soon dropped out and moved out to a Jesuit convent in Zagreb, from where he continued to attend higher gymnasium, but continued to rebel against his father by refusing to attend Hungarian classes. In March 1842, together with nine other students, he founded a Čitaonica Narodna in Zagreb, and became its first president. In 1843, with the help of a scholarship provided by bishop Haulik, he went to study theology in Vienna at the Pázmáneum.

In 1847, he spent a summer in Glina where he befriended Josip Jelačić, and then also moved to the Vienna Augustineum where his friend Josip Juraj Strossmayer had been one of the people in charge. During his studies, he took an interest in politics and became a follower of the Illyrian movement. He also wrote poems and articles for the literary magazine Zora dalmatinska. He took part in the Prague Slavic Congress of 1848 and later that year joined Josip Jelačić's campaign against Hungary. He worked as his correspondent, contacting the leaders of the Czech national movement and later became his envoy in Paris. In France, he published articles in the Journal des débats and La Tribune des Peuples informing the French public about Jelačić's campaign, advocating the idea of ​​a broad federalist restructuring of the Habsburg monarchy.

On his return back home, he was made a secretary in the government of the Virovitica County in Osijek in the summer of 1849. Due to political disagreements, Jelačić and Brlić began to distance themselves from one another. The Bishop of Đakovo Josip Juraj Strossmayer would support a second diplomatic engagement for Brlić in Paris, which also allowed him to travel to other European cities. From 1850 to 1851, he was secretary of Matica ilirska and manager of the estate of Bishop Strossmayer in Đakovo. Afterwards, he went to study Law in Vienna, completing his education 1857 before opening his own practice in Brod na Savi.

Brlić collaborated in periodicals, was editor of Kolo magazine, and translated and edited the works of older Croatian writers.

In 1861 he was an active participant in the Croatian Parliament, working as a delegate for the Military Frontier and leading its representatives to the emperor, championing for the unification of the border area with Croatia and Slavonia. During the 1860s, he worked closely with the entourage of Serbian politician Ilija Garašanin. It is believed he was part of the Serbian intelligence network because of the existence of encrypted communication between him and Antonijo Orešković, but the extent and purpose of his involvement in the intelligence network remains unclear. It is apparent that Brlić was included in the radical plans of Strossmayer and Garašanin to create a common state of South Slavs that were under Austria and Turkey at the time.

He was one of the most prominent advocates of unficiation of South Slavs in the 19th century.

Brlić was a follower of the Serbian linguist Vuk Karadžić, and his grammatical theories combined the Karadžić and Illyrian philological models, following in the steps of his father's work, Karadžić, Đuro Daničić, Franc Miklošič and Vjekoslav Babukić.

Brlić was married to painter Franciska Daubači. They had a summer house in Brodsko Brdo. Together, they had two sons.

He was a polyglot and spoke German, French, Polish, Czech, Russian, Slovak, and English.

He died on 21 May 1868, six days after his 42nd birthday. He left behind a number of written correspondences with politicians he had between 1840 and 1857.

Works 

As a law student in Vienna, he published two historiographical books and one on the grammar of the 'Illyrian' language:

 Die freiwillige Theilnahme der Serben und Kroaten an der vier letztenösterreichisch-türkischen Kriegen [The voluntary participation of the Serbs and Croats at the last four Austro-Turkish wars] (1854)
 Grammatik der Iliyrischen Sprache [Grammar of the Illyrian language] (1854)
 Izvori srpske povjesnice iz turskijeh spomenika [Sources of Serbian history from Turkish monuments] (1857)

References

Sources

Further reading
 

19th-century Croatian people
Croatian writers
Croatian politicians
People from Slavonski Brod
People of the Illyrian movement